The Monster Mortar was one of the largest mortars ever developed. Also called Leopold or the Liège mortar, the   caliber mortar was conceived by the French artillery officer Henri-Joseph Paixhans. The mortar was manufactured under the direction of the Belgian Minister of War Baron Louis Evain and cast at the Royal Canon Foundry (Fonderie royale de canons) in Liège, Belgium in 1832. It saw action at the Battle of Antwerp in December 1832.

Description 
The Monster Mortar was ordered by the Belgian Minister of War Baron Empain. Conceived by the French artillery officer Henri-Joseph Paixhans, the  caliber mortar was cast at the Belgian royal foundry of Cannons in 1832 in Liège, Belgium.

Next to the Monster Mortar, the largest mortars ever developed were two  caliber mortars: Mallet's Mortar, designed by Robert Mallet and tested by the Woolwich Arsenal, London, in 1857; and "Little David" developed in the United States for use in World War II. These mortars never saw action.

Service

Belgian revolution
The Belgian Revolution that began in August 1830 led to the secession of the southern provinces from the United Kingdom of the Netherlands and established an independent Kingdom of Belgium. The Dutch king William I intended to suppress the Belgian Revolution by invading Belgium on 2 August 1831. Over the course of the next few days Belgian forces were defeated several times in battle and Dutch troops advanced deep into Belgian territory until, on 8August, the Belgian government appealed to France for support.  Following the Ten Days' Campaign of the French Armée du Nord under Marshal Étienne Gérard, the Dutch troops started to withdraw. The King of the Netherlands ordered the Dutch General David Hendrik Chassé to hold the Citadel of Antwerp at all costs with 4500 men.

Siege of Antwerp

From the citadel, Chassé bombarded the city of Antwerp, setting fire to hundreds of homes and causing many casualties among the civilian population. These events led to the second intervention by the French. On 15November 1832, the French Armée du Nord and its siege specialist François Haxo began to lay the Dutch troops under siege, quickly occupying Fort Montebello situated to the east of the citadel and to the south of the city from which they started firing at the citadel.

The "Monster Mortar" saw action on 21 December  and 22 December 1832 but was abandoned in Fort Montebello soon after. The mortar used during the Siege of Antwerp exploded during a test firing on 18 May 1833 in Brasschaat, near Antwerp. A second monster mortar was manufactured in Liège in 1834

See also 
List of heavy mortars
List of the largest cannon by caliber

References 
Notes

Bibliography

Further reading 

Mortars of Belgium